Qemal Stafa  may refer to:

 Qemal Stafa, World War II Albanian hero
 Qemal Stafa Stadium, a football stadium in Tirana Albania, named after Qemal Stafa
 Qemal Stafa High School, a high school named after Qemal Stafa